Cinerama refers to a film projection process. Cinerama may also refer to:
Cinerama (band), UK rock band
Cinerama (Rotterdam), cinema in Rotterdam
Seattle Cinerama, cinema in Seattle

See also

Cinéorama, an early film experiment and amusement ride presented for the first time at the 1900 Paris Exposition